Saeed Abedini (born 7 May 1980) is an Iranian American Christian pastor who was imprisoned in Iran in 2012 based on allegations that he compromised national security. During his imprisonment, Abedini became internationally known as a victim of religious persecution. Following international pressure, Abedini was released from prison on 16 January 2016 along with other American prisoners.

Biography

Background
Born in Iran, Abedini is a former Shiʿite who converted to Christianity in 2000. While Christianity is recognized as a minority religion under the Iranian constitution, Shiʿite converts to Christianity suffer discrimination at the hands of Iranian authorities. In particular, such converts are disallowed from worshiping with other Christians in established Christian churches, which has led to the establishment of so-called "house" or "underground" churches where these converts can worship together.

In 2002, Abedini met and married his wife Naghmeh, an American citizen. In the early 2000s, the Abedinis became prominent in the house-church movement in Iran, at a time when the movement was tolerated by the Iranian government. During this period, Abedini is credited with establishing about 100 house churches in 30 Iranian cities with more than 2,000 members. With the election of Mahmoud Ahmedinejad in 2005, however, the house-church movement was subjected to a crackdown by Iranian authorities and the Abedinis moved back to the United States.

In 2008, Abedini became an ordained minister in the U.S. and in 2010, he was granted American citizenship, thus becoming a dual Iranian-American citizen. Abedini lived with his family in Boise, Idaho, where his wife grew up.

Abedini's first trip back to Iran was in 2009 to visit his extended family, when government authorities detained him. According to Abedini, he was threatened with death during his interrogation over his conversion to Christianity. Ultimately, he was released after signing a pledge to cease all house-church activities in the country. As part of this same agreement, Abedini was permitted to return to Iran freely to work on non-sectarian humanitarian efforts.

2012 arrest in Iran
In July 2012, after making his ninth trip to Iran since 2009 to visit his relatives and continue to build an orphanage in the city of Rasht, Abedini was placed under house arrest by the Islamic Revolutionary Guard Corps; his passports were confiscated. He was transferred to Evin Prison in late September.

Prosecution, trial, and sentencing
In mid-January 2013, it was reported that Abedini would go on trial on 21 January and could face the death penalty. He was charged with compromising national security, though the specific allegations were not made public. His supporters said his arrest was due to his conversion and attending peaceful Christianity gatherings in Iran. On 21 January 2013, Iranian state media reported that Abedini would be released after posting a $116,000 bond. His wife, however, stated that the government "has no intention of freeing him and that the announcement is 'a game to silence' international media reports."

On 27 January 2013, following a trial, Judge Pir-Abassi sentenced Abedini to eight years in prison. According to Fox News, Abedini was sentenced for having "undermined the Iranian government by creating a network of Christian house churches and ... attempting to sway Iranian youth away from Islam." The evidence against Abedini was based primarily on his activities in the early 2000s. Abedini was meant to serve his time in Evin Prison.

In early November 2013, Abedini was transferred from Tehran to the Rajai Shahr prison in the town of Karaj, which was populated with heavy criminals and was known for placing prisoners in harsh (and sometimes life-threatening) conditions.

Calls for release
In January 2013, U.S. State Department condemned Abedini's sentencing: "We condemn Iran's continued violation of the universal right of freedom of religion and we call on the Iranian authorities to respect Mr. Abedini's human rights and release him."

Amnesty International repeatedly raised the issue of Abedini's imprisonment, calling him a prisoner of conscience and calling upon Iran to release all those detained for peacefully exercising their rights to freedom of expression, association and assembly.

In May 2015, the United States Senate unanimously passed, 90–0, a resolution calling upon the Iranian government to immediately free Abedini and two other Americans imprisoned in Iran, Amir Hekmati and Jason Rezaian, and to cooperate with the U.S. government to locate and return Robert Levinson, who is missing in the country. The resolution was introduced by Senator James Risch of Idaho, Abedini's home state.

In March 2015, in a message commemorating the Nowruz (the Persian new year), President Barack Obama listed Abedini, Rezaian, and Hekmati, by name and called for their release. Obama said, "[Abedini] has spent two and a half years detained in Iran on charges related to his religious beliefs. He must be returned to his wife and two young children, who needlessly continue to grow up without their father." Obama also met with Naghmeh Abedini during a January 2015 visit to Boise.

In July 2015, in a speech to the Veterans of Foreign Wars, Obama again listed Abedini, Rezaian, and Hekmati by name calling for their release (and for cooperation to find Levinson) and saying, "We are not going to relent until we bring home our Americans who are unjustly detained in Iran." Secretary of State John Kerry said the same month that there was "not one meeting that took place" during the nuclear talks from 2013 to 2015 (which led to the Joint Comprehensive Plan of Action) at which the United States didn't raise the issue of the four Americans.'

In November 2015, Naghmeh Abedini began to back away from speaking out publicly for her husband's release, telling supporters by e-mail that he had been abusive to her and she could "no longer live a lie."

Release
On 16 January 2016, Saeed Abedini was released from prison. Iran said they were being swapped for seven Iranians held in US prisons but there was no immediate US confirmation. "In addition, Iranian state TV said 14 Iranians sought by the US would be removed from an Interpol wanted list." The Washington Post journalist Jason Rezaian, Marine veteran Amir Hekmati and Nosratollah Khosrawi were also released by Iran.

Later developments
In March, 2016, Abedini appeared on The Watchman, a pro-Israel TBN show promoting Israeli-American relations.

Abedini has stated that he was beaten by interrogators during his imprisonment in Iran.

In November 2019, a federal court ruled that the Iranian government owed Abedini $47 million to compensate him for the torture he experienced while he was imprisoned.

Personal life
Abedini married his wife Naghmeh, an American citizen, in 2002. Saeed and Naghmeh Abedini have two children and—as of 2015—were members at the Calvary Chapel church in Boise.

In 2015, during his imprisonment in Iran, Abedini was accused by his wife Naghmeh of years of sexual, physical, and emotional abuse. She also stated that Saeed was addicted to pornography. He had previously received a suspended three-month prison sentence for domestic assault in 2007. Christianity Today published two e-mails Naghmeh sent to supporters about her marriage. She confirmed that she had experienced "physical, emotional, psychological, and sexual abuse through her husband's addiction to pornography". She wrote at the time, "The abuse started early in their marriage and has worsened during Saeed's imprisonment". The two had been speaking by phone and through Skype, but she said she had not spoken with him since October.

On 27 January 2016, Reuters reported that Naghmeh Abedini had filed for a legal separation. Saeed Abedini later filed for divorce. In April 2017, Saeed Abedini announced that the divorce had been finalized.

On 13 February 2017, Abedini pleaded guilty to violating a restraining order that had been obtained by his ex-wife. He was fined, sentenced to community service, and placed on probation. Abedini was arrested on 18 March 2018 for allegedly violating a no-contact order by sending derogatory messages to his ex-wife; he pleaded not guilty.

See also

 Christianity in Iran
 Evangelism
 Freedom of religion in Iran
 Human rights in Iran
 List of former Muslims
 Youcef Nadarkhani
 List of foreign nationals detained in Iran

References

1980 births
Living people
2012 in Iran
2013 in Iran
American former Shia Muslims
American Protestants
Converts to Protestantism from Shia Islam
Iranian former Shia Muslims
Iranian Protestants
People convicted of assault
People from Boise, Idaho
Persecution of Christians in Iran
Amnesty International prisoners of conscience held by Iran
American people imprisoned in Iran
People charged with apostasy in Iran
Iranian emigrants to the United States
Inmates of Evin Prison